Hermetia albipoda is a species of soldier fly in the family Stratiomyidae.

Distribution
New Guinea.

References

Stratiomyidae
Insects described in 2001
Diptera of Australasia
Endemic fauna of New Guinea